Selenomethionine (SeMet) is a naturally occurring amino acid. The L-selenomethionine enantiomer is the main form of selenium found in Brazil nuts, cereal grains, soybeans, and grassland legumes, while Se-methylselenocysteine, or its γ-glutamyl derivative, is the major form of selenium found in Astragalus, Allium, and Brassica species. In vivo, selenomethionine is randomly incorporated instead of methionine. Selenomethionine is readily oxidized.

Selenomethionine's antioxidant activity arises from its ability to deplete reactive oxygen species. Selenium and methionine also play separate roles in the formation and recycling of glutathione, a key endogenous antioxidant in many organisms, including humans.

Substitution chemistry issues 
Selenium and sulfur are chalcogens that share many chemical properties so the substitution of methionine with selenomethionine may have only a limited effect on protein structure and function. However, the incorporation of selenomethionine into tissue proteins and keratin in the cattle, birds and fish causes alkali disease.

Alkali disease is characterized by emaciation, loss of hair, deformation and shedding of hooves, loss of vitality, and erosion of the joints of long bones.

Incorporation of selenomethionine into proteins in place of methionine aids the structure elucidation of proteins by X-ray crystallography using single- or multi-wavelength anomalous diffraction (SAD or MAD). The incorporation of heavy atoms such as selenium helps solve the phase problem in X-ray crystallography.

Dietary intake 
Selenomethionine is readily available as a dietary supplement. It has been suggested by nutritionists that selenomethionine, as an organic form of selenium, is easier for the human body to absorb than selenite, which is an inorganic form. It was determined in a clinical trial that selenomethionine is absorbed 19% better than selenite.

See also
 Selenocysteine, another selenium-containing amino acid, but one that is incorporated into specific locations of specific proteins as directed by the genetic code.
 Selenoprotein
 Canadian Reference Material of selenomethionine

References

External links
 PDB file for MSE 
 PDB entries containing Het Group MSE

Amino acids
Organoselenium compounds
Selenium(−II) compounds
Selenoethers